Mahisha Machhlandapur  is a village located in Habra I block in the Barasat Sadar subdivision of the North 24 Parganas district in the state of West Bengal, India.

See also 
 Habra
 Habra I
 Habra railway station

References 

Villages in North 24 Parganas district